Deo Damla is a mountain of the Garhwal Himalaya in Uttarakhand, India. It is situated in the eastern rim of Nanda Devi Sanctuary on the watershed of Milam Glacier and Nanda Devi basin. It is 63rd highest located entirely within the Uttrakhand. Nanda Devi, is the highest mountain in this category. It lies 1.8 km SSE of Mangraon . Its nearest higher neighbor Rishi Pahar  lies 8.3 km NNW and it is 10.6 km SSW of Nanda Devi . It lies 1.4 km north of Bamchu .

Climbing history
It was first climbed by Eric Shipton and two sherpa's Ang Tharkay and Ang Dawa in 1936 during Osmaston–Shipton 1936 expedition, as members of Major Osmaston's party which went into the Nanda Devi region under the orders of the Surveyor-General in 1936. On 23rd September they started before dawn to climb up a steep and difficult ice ridge which involved of step-cutting. Ang Dawa became exhausted early in the climb, and by the time Ang Tharkay and Eric Shipton reached the top the Milam glacier was filled with cloud, and they did not get the view they had hoped for. It was an unnamed peak at that time but highest on that side.

Neighboring and subsidiary peaks
Neighboring or subsidiary peaks of Deo Damla:
 Nanda Devi: 
 Mangraon: 
 Lohar Deo: 
 Lhatu Dhura: 
 Rishi Kot: 
 Changabang:

Glaciers and rivers
On the eastern side it stands between Bamchu Glacier and Mangraon Glacier. Both these glacier's joins Milam Glacier further east, from the snout of Milam glacier emerges Goriganga River that later joins the Kali River at Jauljibi. On the western side Uttari Nanda Devi Glacier joins Uttari Rishi Glacier and drains into Rish Ganga. Rishi Ganga met with Dhauliganga River near Rini. Later Dhauli ganga met with Alaknanda at Vishnuprayag. Alaknanda River is one of the main tributaries of river Ganga that later joins Bhagirathi River the other main tributaries of river Ganga at Devprayag and became Ganga there after.

Gallery

See also

 List of Himalayan peaks of Uttarakhand

References

Mountains of Uttarakhand
Six-thousanders of the Himalayas
Geography of Chamoli district